Bocephus may refer to:

Hank Williams Jr., often known as Bocephus
Rod Brasfield's ventriloquist dummy
Bocephus King, Canadian independent musician